Delhi Suburban Railway is a suburban rail service operated by Northern Railway for the National Capital Region (NCR). This railway service covers Delhi, along with the adjoining districts of Gurgaon, Faridabad, Ghaziabad, Sonipat and other adjoining places in Haryana and  Uttar Pradesh. These services are mostly run using EMU and MEMU rakes. This also includes passenger trains and DMU services up to Rewari in Haryana, a part of the NCR. Presently there are 46 railway stations in Delhi.

According to the railway ministry, plans are under way to renovate and integrate the network with the Delhi Metro through construction of interchanges with metro stations. The project is aimed to reduce congestion in the city.

Services 
Delhi Suburban Railway uses the same tracks that are also used for long distance trains. In 2009 Ladies Special trains were introduced between New Delhi and Palwal and from New Delhi to Ghaziabad and Panipat.

At present, EMUs in Delhi run with 12 coaches, of which ten are general compartments and two are ladies compartment. As per the Northern Railway estimates, there are more than 110 suburban trains, which ply on important sections.

Future development 
With Delhi Metro growing at a rapid pace, there has been very little focus to improve the condition of the Delhi Suburban Railway. There have been reports of strengthening the services so that more commuters can avail themselves of the facility. Feasibility studies have also been done, and in deference to the commuter demand, there were also plans to start EMU services from Gurgaon. An integrated rail-bus transit (IRBT) system to connect Delhi with the satellite towns of Gurgaon, Ghaziabad, and Sahibabad is being promoted by the government.
A feasibility study has already been completed, and a steering committee has been appointed to monitor the project. The IRBT will have two dedicated tracks.

Fleet gallery

See also 
 Urban rail transit in India
 List of railway stations in Delhi
 Delhi Ring Railway

References

External links 
 Dedicated tracks to run EMU
 Delhi ring railway timetable

Transport in Delhi
Suburban rail in India
Year of establishment missing